Gaspar Correia (1492 – c. 1563 in Goa) was a Portuguese historian considered a Portuguese Polybius.  He authored Lendas da Índia (Legends of India), one of the earliest and most important works about Portuguese rule in Asia.

Biography 

Little is known of the author or his family origins and birthplace. It is assumed that he was born in 1492. He lived mostly in Portuguese India, reportedly arriving around 1512-14 to serve as a soldier and then chosen as scrivener to Afonso de Albuquerque, for which he was very proud. He returned to Portugal in 1529 for some time but later returned to India. His work Lendas da Índia, though written in a rude style, is considered an indispensable contemporary reference, having profited from his thirty-five years' work in India, and from privileged sources unknown to Fernão Lopes de Castanheda or João de Barros. He wrote the first European account on Asiatic Cholera. One theory suggests that he was murdered in Portuguese Malacca, by order of Governor Estêvão da Gama, the son of Vasco da Gama.

The 3,500-page Lendas da Índia manuscript was brought from India to Portugal by Miguel da Gama shortly after Correia's death and copies circulated only among authorised persons.  One author claims, without citing any source, that the manuscript was published in 12 volumes in 1556 but, if it existed, no trace remains. His family retained the manuscript of the original, which was printed in 1858 (first part) and 1864 (second part) by the Royal Academy of Sciences of Lisbon.

He died around 1563 in Goa, Portuguese India.

References

Bibliography
 CORREIA, Gaspar. Lendas da Índia (introduction and review by M. Lopes de Almeida). Porto: 1975.
 BELL, Aubrey Fitz Gerald, "Gaspar Corrêa", Hispanic notes & monographs; essays, studies, and brief biographies issued by the Hispanic Society of America. Portuguese series v, Volume 5 of Hispanic society of America, Oxford University Press, H. Milford, 1924.
 BANHA de ANDRADE, António Alberto, Gaspar Correia, o 1.º historiador português do Oriente. (Gaspar Correia, the First Portuguese Historian of the Far East) Instituto de Investigação Científica Tropical, Centro de Estudos de História e Cartografia Antiga, Lisbon, 1985.

External links
 CORREA, Gaspar. The Three Voyages of Vasco da Gama, and His Viceroyalty. From the Lendas da India of Gaspar Correa, accompanied by original documents (translated from the Portuguese, with notes and an introduction by the Hon. Henry E. J. Stanley). Printed for the Hakluyt Society, London: 1869. 
 CORREA, Gaspar. Lendas da India. Lisboa: Academia Real das Sciencias de Lisboa, 1858-1866. 8 volumes. 

1490s births
1560s deaths
Portuguese male writers
Maritime history of Portugal
Portuguese chroniclers
Portuguese Renaissance writers
Portuguese travel writers
16th-century Portuguese historians
History of Kerala